The Southern Pacific Gyre is part of the Earth's system of rotating ocean currents, bounded by the Equator to the north, Australia to the west, the Antarctic Circumpolar Current to the south, and South America to the east. The center of the South Pacific Gyre is the oceanic pole of inaccessibility, the site on Earth farthest from any continents and productive ocean regions and is regarded as Earth's largest oceanic desert. With an area of 37 million square kilometres it makes up ~10 % of the Earth's ocean surface. The gyre, as with Earth's other four gyres, contains an area with elevated concentrations of pelagic plastics, chemical sludge, and other debris known as the South Pacific garbage patch.

Sediment flux and accumulation 

Earth's trade winds and Coriolis force cause the ocean currents in South Pacific Ocean to circulate counterclockwise. The currents act to isolate the center of the gyre from nutrient upwelling and few nutrients are transported there by the wind (eolian processes) because there is relatively little land in the Southern Hemisphere to supply dust to the prevailing winds. The low levels of nutrients in the region result in extremely low primary productivity in the ocean surface and subsequently very low flux of organic material settling to the ocean floor as marine snow. The low levels of biogenic and eolian deposition cause sediments to accumulate on the ocean floor very slowly. The sediment thickness (from basement basalts to the seafloor) ranges from 1 to 70m, with thinner sediments occurring closer to the center of the Gyre. The low flux of particles to the South Pacific Gyre cause the water there to be the clearest seawater in the world.

Subseafloor biosphere 
Beneath the seafloor, the marine sediments and surrounding porewaters contain an unusual subseafloor biosphere. Despite extremely low amounts of buried organic material, microbes live throughout the entire sediment column.  Average cell abundances and net rates of respiration are a few orders of magnitude lower than in any other subseafloor biosphere previously studied.

The South Pacific Gyre subseafloor community is also unusual because it contains oxygen throughout the entire sediment column.  In other subseafloor biospheres, microbial respiration will break down organic material and consume all the oxygen near the seafloor leaving the deeper portions of the sediment column anoxic.  However, in the South Pacific Gyre the low levels of organic material, the low rates of respiration, and the thin sediments allow the porewater to be oxygenated throughout the entire sediment column. In July 2020, marine biologists reported that aerobic microorganisms (mainly), in "quasi-suspended animation", were found in organically poor sediments, up to 101.5 million years old, 250 feet below the seafloor of the region and could be the longest-living life forms ever found.

Radiolytic H2: a benthic energy source 
Benthic microbes in organic-poor sediments in oligotrophic oceanic regions, such as the South Pacific Gyre, are hypothesized to metabolize radiolytic hydrogen (H2) as a primary energy source.

The oceanic regions within the South Pacific Gyre (SPG), and other subtropical gyres, are characterized by low primary productivity in the surface ocean; i.e. they are oligotrophic. The center of the SPG is the furthest oceanic province from a continent and contains the clearest ocean water on Earth with ≥ 0.14 mg chlorophyll per m3. Carbon exported to the underlying deep ocean sediments via the biological pump is limited in the SPG, resulting in sedimentation rates that are orders of magnitude lower than in productive zones, e.g. continental margins.

Typically, deep-ocean benthic microbial life utilizes the organic carbon exported from surface waters. In oligotrophic regions where sediments are poor in organic material, subsurface benthic life exploits other primary energy sources, such as molecular hydrogen (H2).

Radiolysis of interstitial water 
Radioactive decay of naturally occurring uranium (238U and 235U), thorium (232Th), and potassium (40K) in seafloor sediments collectively bombard the interstitial water with α, β, and γ radiation. The irradiation ionizes and breaks apart water molecules, eventually yielding H2. The products of this reaction are aqueous electrons (e−aq), hydrogen radicals (H·), protons (H+), and hydroxyl radicals (OH·). The radicals are highly reactive, therefore short-lived, and recombine to produce hydrogen peroxide (H2O2), and molecular hydrogen (H2).

The amount of radiolytic H2 production in seafloor sediments is dependent on the quantities of radioactive isotopes present, sediment porosity, and grain size. These criteria indicate that certain sediment types, such as abyssal clays and siliceous oozes, may have higher radiolytic H2 production relative to other seafloor strata. Also, radiolytic H2 production has been measured in seawater intrusions into subseafloor basement basalts.

Microbial activity 
The microbes best suited to utilize radiolytic H2 are the knallgas bacteria, lithoautotrophes, that obtain energy by oxidizing molecular hydrogen via the knallgas reaction:

              H2 (aq) + 0.5O2 (aq)  H2O (l)

In the surface layer of sediment cores from oligotrophic regions of the SPG, O2 is the primary electron acceptor used in microbial metabolisms. The O2 concentrations decline slightly in surface sediment (initial few decimeters) and are unchanged to depth. Meanwhile, nitrate concentrations slightly increase downward or remain constant in sediment column at approximately the same concentrations as the deep water above the seafloor. Measured negative fluxes of O2 in the surface layer demonstrate that a relatively low abundance of aerobic microbes that are oxidizing the minimally deposited organic matter from the ocean above. Extremely low cell counts corroborate that microbes exist in small quantities in these surface sediments. In contrast, a sediment cores outside of the SPG show rapid elimination of O2 and nitrate at 1 meter below sea floor (mbsf) and 2.5 mbsf, respectively. This is evidence of much higher microbial activity, both aerobic and anaerobic.

The production of radiolytic H2 (electron donor) is stoichiometrically balanced with production of 0.5 O2 (electron acceptor), therefore a measurable flux in O2 is not expected in the substrate if both radiolysis of water and knallgas bacteria co-occur. So, despite the known occurrence of radiolytic H2 production, molecular hydrogen is below the detectable limit in the SPG cores, leading to the hypothesis that H2 is the primary energy source in low-organic seafloor sediments below the surface layer.

Water color 
Satellite data images show that some areas in the gyre are greener than the surrounding clear blue water, which is frequently interpreted as areas with higher concentrations of living phytoplankton. However, the assumption that greener ocean water always contains more phytoplankton is not always true. Even though the South Pacific Gyre contains these patches of green water, it has very little organism growth. Instead, some studies hypothesize that these green patches are a result of the accumulated waste of marine life. The optical properties of the South Pacific Gyre remain largely unexplored.

Garbage patch

References

Further reading
 

South Pacific
Oceanic gyres
Articles containing video clips